Iazoni Cave Natural Monument also known as Tskaltsitela Cave is a karst cave located across the river Tskaltsitela near village Godogni, Terjola Municipality, just outside Kutaisi in Imereti region of Georgia, 135  metres above sea level.  Cave is on the right bank of Tskaltsitela river, the tributary of the Rioni, near Godogni village bridge.

Morphology 
Iazoni cave is carved in the Lower Cretaceous limestone, which is a riverbed material. Cave total length is 40 meters. Cave is notable for it arch-shaped ceilings naturally decorated with small  stalactites accompanied by stalagmites on the floor. Width of the cave is quickly reduced to 2.5 m  at a distance of just 10 m from the entrance and the ceiling height decreases to 0.5 m closer to the cave end section. Silty muck makes cave floor slippery and access to cave difficult.

Fauna and paleontological findings 
The cave provides shelter to various animals. It is home to troglofauna such as Troglocaris (Xiphocaridinella) kutaissiana (Sadowsky, 1930) 
Paleontological findings of animal bones and flint tools established presence of cave dwellers of the Paleolithic Age.

See also 
Tskaltsitela Gorge Natural Monument

References

Natural monuments of Georgia (country)
Caves of Georgia (country)
Protected areas established in 2007
Geography of Imereti